Gerrit Tromp (24 October 1901 – 2 December 1938) was a Dutch rower. He competed in the men's eight event at the 1924 Summer Olympics.

References

External links
 

1901 births
1938 deaths
Dutch male rowers
Olympic rowers of the Netherlands
Rowers at the 1924 Summer Olympics
Sportspeople from Leeuwarden